Walter Gould (25 September 1938 – 10 March 2018) was an English professional footballer who played as a right winger in the Football League for Sheffield United, York City and Brighton & Hove Albion. He later played for Durban United and Hellenic in South Africa. 

Gould arrived on the Stoke City coaching staff at the start of the 1977–78 season to team up with George Eastham who had become manager. He was reserve-team coach when Cyril Lea resigned in New Year 1980. Gould then stepped up to be number two to Alan Durban. He subsequently served Richie Barker when he became manager, but left in March 1982. There were rumoured to be differences between Gould and some of the senior players at this time, with one `training ground incident` resulting in Ray Evans, the captain, being suspended for two weeks. Days later Gould was replaced by Bill Asprey.

Career statistics
Source:

References

1938 births
2018 deaths
People from Thrybergh
English footballers
Association football wingers
Rawmarsh Welfare F.C. players
Sheffield United F.C. players
York City F.C. players
Brighton & Hove Albion F.C. players
Hellenic F.C. players
Durban United F.C. players
East London United F.C. players
Guildford City F.C. players
Durban City F.C. players
Chelmsford City F.C. players
English Football League players
Association football coaches
Stoke City F.C. non-playing staff